Danielle Jasmin Wiener (born July 30, 1986) is an American actress from Los Angeles, California. She is the sister of singer Sabrina Wiener Keaton (who appeared in the 1993 Kidsongs VHS episode "Play Along Songs (Play-Along Songs)") and actor Joshua "Josh" Wiener.

Filmography

References

External links

20th-century American actresses
21st-century American actresses
American child actresses
American film actresses
American television actresses
Living people
Actresses from Pasadena, California
Place of birth missing (living people)
American people of Peruvian descent
Hispanic and Latino American actresses
1986 births